Irving Shapiro may refer to:

Irving Shapiro, New York labor racketeer with the Shapiro Brothers 
Irving S. Shapiro (1916–2001), lawyer